Hafiz Syed Riaz Hussain Najafi is a Shia scholar from Pakistan. He is the principal of Jamia-tul-Muntazar Lahore, the largest Shia madrassah in Pakistan.

References

Year of birth missing (living people)
Living people
Pakistani educators
People from Muzaffargarh District
People from Muzaffargarh
Pakistani ayatollahs